The Chico Formation is a geologic formation of the Campanian Age during the Cretaceous Period, found in California and southern Oregon.

Geology
The MesozoicEra formation can regionally overlie the Vaqueros Formation, and can regionally underlie the Martinez Formation or Tejon Formation.

The Chico Formation is exposed in the Southern California Coast Ranges, western San Joaquin Valley, north of Mount Diablo, and in the Chico area of the northeastern Sacramento Valley.

It is also found in the eastern Simi Hills in Bell Canyon and Dayton Canyon, located in Los Angeles and Ventura Counties, near the community of West Hills.

Paleofauna
Dinosaur remains are among the fossils that have been recovered from the formation, from the Late Cretaceous of the Mesozoic Era.

Species
The lizard and bird species listed in the table below date from the Late Cretaceous Epoch.

See also

 List of fossiliferous stratigraphic units in California
 List of dinosaur-bearing rock formations
 List of stratigraphic units with indeterminate dinosaur fossils
 
 Paleontology in California

References

Campanian Stage
Cretaceous California
Cretaceous geology of Oregon
Sandstone formations of the United States
Geology of Contra Costa County, California
Geology of Los Angeles County, California
Geology of Ventura County, California
Geography of the San Joaquin Valley
Natural history of Butte County, California
Upper Cretaceous Series of North America
Paleontology in California
Chico, California
Geography of the Sacramento Valley
Simi Hills
Geologic formations of California